Keep on Your Mean Side is the debut album by UK based indie rock band The Kills.  Originally released on March 10, 2003, through Domino Recording Company, it was later reissued on May 4, 2009, with five additional bonus tracks.

The song "Wait" was featured in the film Children of Men (2006), while "Monkey 23" was featured in the film The Beat That My Heart Skipped (2005) and in Adam Curtis' BBC documentary All Watched Over by Machines of Loving Grace Part 1 (2011); "Cat Claw" and "Wait" were both overheard in the Criminal Minds Season 3 episode, "Doubt," and  "Fried My Little Brains" was used in the Sherlock Series 3 episode, "The Sign of Three", and in the game Gran Turismo 6.

Background

Following international touring, they entered Toe Rag Studios, where The White Stripes had recorded their album Elephant, to record Keep on Your Mean Side, mostly on 8-track, in just 2 weeks. Distributed in the US and UK by Rough Trade Records, the album was similar in style to the EP, veering from the Velvets-esque stomp of "Wait" to the noisy, dirty garage punk blues of "Fuck the People" and dark psychedelia of "Kissy Kissy". The record was well received by the music press, though the White Stripes comparisons would not go away.

Maintaining an anti-careerist, anti-music industry attitude, the band rarely granted interviews. Rather, they got the music press to come to them with their minimalist yet powerful live shows (which also included the drum machine), the pair maintaining an air of tension by subverting the expected role of stage performer. Mosshart chain-smoked while singing, rarely speaking to the audience, whilst Hince violently ripped blues riffs from his instrument. At a New York City show following the ban on public smoking, Mosshart went on stage with three bottles of water, lit up a cigarette and proceeded to smoke constantly from the first song to the last note of the set.

Reception 

Reviews for Keep on Your Mean Side were wide-ranging but mostly positive with a few exceptions. It has a normalized rating of 70 out of 100 on Metacritic based on 18 professional reviews. Rolling Stone was complimentary, saying the music was "dark, kick-ass garage rock" and the album was "a bruising disc of post-modern blues". AllMusic described it as "sneering, sexy blues-punk" that is "relatively fresh and distinctive".

Track listing

2009 Reissue Bonus Tracks

Personnel
The Kills
Jamie "Hotel" Hince - vocals, guitars, dictaphone, organ, harmonica, electric viola, drum machine, production
Alison "VV" Mosshart – vocals, guitars, dictaphone, production

Chart performance

References

2003 debut albums
Albums produced by Jamie Hince
Domino Recording Company albums
The Kills albums